Unbiquadium, also known as element 124 or eka-uranium, is the hypothetical chemical element with atomic number 124 and placeholder symbol Ubq. Unbiquadium and Ubq are the temporary IUPAC name and symbol, respectively, until the element is discovered, confirmed, and a permanent name is decided upon. In the periodic table, unbiquadium is expected to be a g-block superactinide and the sixth element in the 8th period. Unbiquadium has attracted attention, as it may lie within the island of stability, leading to longer half-lives, especially for 308Ubq which is predicted to have a magic number of neutrons (184).

Despite several searches, unbiquadium has not been synthesized, nor have any naturally occurring isotopes been found to exist. It is believed that the synthesis of unbiquadium will be far more challenging than that of lighter undiscovered elements, and nuclear instability may pose further difficulties in identifying unbiquadium, unless the island of stability has a stronger stabilizing effect than predicted in this region.

As a member of the superactinide series, unbiquadium is expected to bear some resemblance to its possible lighter congener uranium. The valence electrons of unbiquadium are expected to participate in chemical reactions fairly easily, though relativistic effects may significantly influence some of its properties; for example, the electron configuration has been calculated to differ considerably from the one predicted by the Aufbau principle.

Introduction

History

Synthesis attempts
Because complete nuclear shells (or, equivalently, a magic number of protons or neutrons) may confer additional stability on the nuclei of superheavy elements, moving closer to the center of the island of stability, it was thought that the synthesis of element 124 or nearby elements would populate longer-lived nuclei within the island. Scientists at GANIL (Grand Accélérateur National d'Ions Lourds) attempted to measure the direct and delayed fission of compound nuclei of elements with Z = 114, 120, and 124 in order to probe shell effects in this region and to pinpoint the next spherical proton shell. In 2006, with full results published in 2008, the team provided results from a reaction involving the bombardment of a natural germanium target with uranium ions:

 +  → * → fission

The team reported that they had been able to identify compound nuclei fissioning with half-lives > 10−18 s. This result suggests a strong stabilizing effect at Z = 124 and points to the next proton shell at Z > 120, not at Z = 114 as previously thought. A compound nucleus is a loose combination of nucleons that have not arranged themselves into nuclear shells yet. It has no internal structure and is held together only by the collision forces between the target and projectile nuclei. It is estimated that it requires around 10−14 s for the nucleons to arrange themselves into nuclear shells, at which point the compound nucleus becomes a nuclide, and this number is used by IUPAC as the minimum half-life a claimed isotope must have to potentially be recognised as being discovered. Thus, the GANIL experiments do not count as a discovery of element 124.

The fission of the compound nucleus 312124 was also studied in 2006 at the tandem ALPI heavy-ion accelerator at the Laboratori Nazionali di Legnaro (Legnaro National Laboratories) in Italy:

 +  → * → fission

Similarly to previous experiments conducted at the JINR (Joint Institute for Nuclear Research), fission fragments clustered around doubly magic nuclei such as 132Sn (Z = 50, N = 82), revealing a tendency for superheavy nuclei to expel such doubly magic nuclei in fission. The average number of neutrons per fission from the 312124 compound nucleus (relative to lighter systems) was also found to increase, confirming that the trend of heavier nuclei emitting more neutrons during fission continues into the superheavy mass region.

Possible natural occurrence
A study in 1976 by a group of American researchers from several universities proposed that primordial superheavy elements, mainly livermorium, unbiquadium, unbihexium, and unbiseptium, could be a cause of unexplained radiation damage (particularly radiohalos) in minerals. Unbiquadium was then suggested to exist in nature with its possible congener uranium in detectable quantities, at a relative abundance of 10−11. Such unbiquadium nuclei were thought to undergo alpha decay with very long half-lives down to flerovium, which would then exist in natural lead at a similar concentration (10−11) and undergo spontaneous fission. This prompted many researchers to search for them in nature from 1976 to 1983. A group led by Tom Cahill, a professor at the University of California at Davis, claimed in 1976 that they had detected alpha particles and X-rays with the right energies to cause the damage observed, supporting the presence of these elements. Others claimed that none had been detected, and questioned the proposed characteristics of primordial superheavy nuclei. In particular, they cited that the magic number N = 228 necessary for enhanced stability would create a neutron-excessive nucleus in unbiquadium that would not be beta-stable. This activity was also proposed to be caused by nuclear transmutations in natural cerium, raising further ambiguity upon this claimed observation of superheavy elements.

The possible extent of primordial superheavy elements on Earth today is uncertain. Even if they are confirmed to have caused the radiation damage long ago, they might now have decayed to mere traces, or even be completely gone. It is also uncertain if such superheavy nuclei may be produced naturally at all, as spontaneous fission is expected to terminate the r-process responsible for heavy element formation between mass number 270 and 290, well before elements such as unbiquadium may be formed.

Naming
Using the 1979 IUPAC recommendations, the element should be temporarily called unbiquadium (symbol Ubq) until it is discovered, the discovery is confirmed, and a permanent name chosen. Although widely used in the chemical community on all levels, from chemistry classrooms to advanced textbooks, the recommendations are mostly ignored among scientists who work theoretically or experimentally on superheavy elements, who call it "element 124", with the symbol E124, (124), or 124. Some researchers have also referred to unbiquadium as eka-uranium, a name derived from the system Dmitri Mendeleev used to predict unknown elements, though such an extrapolation might not work for g-block elements with no known congeners and eka-uranium would instead refer to element 144 or 146 when the term is meant to denote the element directly below uranium.

Prospects for future synthesis
Every element from mendelevium onward was produced in fusion-evaporation reactions, culminating in the discovery of the heaviest known element oganesson in 2002 and more recently tennessine in 2010. These reactions approached the limit of current technology; for example, the synthesis of tennessine required 22 milligrams of 249Bk and an intense 48Ca beam for six months. The intensity of beams in superheavy element research cannot exceed 1012 projectiles per second without damaging the target and detector, and producing larger quantities of increasingly rare and unstable actinide targets is impractical.
Consequently, future experiments must be done at facilities such as the superheavy element factory (SHE-factory) at the Joint Institute for Nuclear Research (JINR) or RIKEN, which will allow experiments to run for longer stretches of time with increased detection capabilities and enable otherwise inaccessible reactions. Even so, it is expected to be a great challenge to continue past elements 120 or 121 given short predicted half-lives and low predicted cross sections.

The production of new superheavy elements will require projectiles heavier than 48Ca, which was successfully used in the discovery of elements 114–118, though this necessitates more symmetric reactions which are less favorable. Hence, it is likely that the reactions between 58Fe and a 249Cf or  251Cf target are most promising. Studies on the fission of various superheavy compound nuclei have found that the dynamics of 48Ca- and 58Fe-induced reactions are similar, suggesting that 58Fe projectiles may be viable in producing superheavy nuclei up to Z = 124 or possibly 125. It is also possible that a reaction with 251Cf will produce the compound nucleus 309Ubq* with 185 neutrons, immediately above the N = 184 shell closure. For this reason, the compound nucleus is predicted to have relatively high survival probability and low neutron separation energy, leading to the 1n–3n channels and isotopes 306–308Ubq with a relatively high cross section. These dynamics are highly speculative, as the cross section may be far lower should trends in the production of elements 112–118 continue or the fission barriers be lower than expected, regardless of shell effects, leading to decreased stability against spontaneous fission (which is of growing importance). Nonetheless, the prospect of reaching the N = 184 shell on the proton-rich side of the chart of nuclides by increasing proton number has long been considered; already in 1970, Soviet nuclear physicist Georgy Flyorov suggested bombarding a plutonium target with zinc projectiles to produce isotopes of element 124 at the N = 184 shell.

Predicted properties

Nuclear stability and isotopes

Unbiquadium is of interest to researchers because of its possible location near the center of an island of stability, a theoretical region comprising longer-lived superheavy nuclei. Such an island of stability was first proposed by University of California professor Glenn Seaborg, specifically predicting a region of stability centered at element 126 (unbihexium) and encompassing nearby elements, including unbiquadium, with half-lives possibly as long as 109 years. In known elements, the stability of nuclei decreases greatly with the increase in atomic number after uranium, the heaviest primordial element, so that all observed isotopes with an atomic number above 101 decay radioactively with a half-life under a day. Nevertheless, there is a slight increase in nuclear stability in nuclides around atomic numbers 110–114, which suggests the presence of an island of stability. This is attributed to the possible closure of nuclear shells in the superheavy mass region, with stabilizing effects that may lead to half-lives on the order of years or longer for some as-yet undiscovered isotopes of these elements. While still unproven, the existence of superheavy elements as heavy as oganesson provides evidence of such stabilizing effects, as elements with an atomic number greater than approximately 104 are extremely unstable in models neglecting magic numbers.

In this region of the periodic table, N = 184 and N = 228 have been proposed as closed neutron shells, and various atomic numbers have been proposed as closed proton shells, including Z = 124. The island of stability is characterized by longer half-lives of nuclei located near these magic numbers, though the extent of stabilizing effects is uncertain due to predictions of weakening of the proton shell closures and possible loss of double magicity. More recent research predicts the island of stability to instead be centered at beta-stable copernicium isotopes 291Cn and 293Cn, which would place unbiquadium well above the island and result in short half-lives regardless of shell effects. A 2016 study on the decay properties of unbiquadium isotopes 284–339Ubq predicts that 284–304Ubq lie outside the proton drip line and thus may be proton emitters, 305–323Ubq may undergo alpha decay, with some chains terminating as far as flerovium, and heavier isotopes will decay by spontaneous fission. These results, as well as those from a quantum-tunneling model, predict no half-lives over a millisecond for isotopes lighter than 319Ubq, as well as especially short half-lives for 309–314Ubq in the sub-microsecond range due to destabilizing effects immediately above the shell at N = 184. This renders the identification of many unbiquadium isotopes nearly impossible with current technology, as detectors cannot distinguish rapid successive signals from alpha decays in a time period shorter than microseconds.

Increasingly short spontaneous fission half-lives of superheavy nuclei and the possible domination of fission over alpha decay will also probably determine the stability of unbiquadium isotopes. While some fission half-lives constituting a "sea of instability" may be on the order of 10−18 s as a consequence of very low fission barriers, especially in even–even nuclei due to pairing effects, stabilizing effects at N = 184 and N = 228 may allow the existence of relatively long-lived isotopes. For N = 184, fission half-lives may increase, though alpha half-lives are still expected to be on the order of microseconds or less, despite the shell closure at 308Ubq. It is also possible that the island of stability may shift to the N = 198 region, where total half-lives may be on the order of seconds, in contrast to neighboring isotopes that would undergo fission in less than a microsecond. In the neutron-rich region around N = 228, alpha half-lives are also predicted to increase with increasing neutron number, meaning that the stability of such nuclei would primarily depend on the location of the beta-stability line and resistance to fission. One early calculation by P. Moller, a physicist at Los Alamos National Laboratory, estimates the total half-life of 352Ubq (with N = 228) to be around 67 seconds, and possibly the longest in the N = 228 region.

Chemical
Unbiquadium is the fourth member of the superactinide series and should be similar to uranium: both elements have six valence electrons over a noble gas core. In the superactinide series, the Aufbau principle is expected to break down due to relativistic effects, and an overlap of the 5g, 6f, 7d, and 8p orbitals is expected. The ground state electron configuration of unbiquadium is thus predicted to be [Og] 6f3 8s2 8p1 or 6f2 8s2 8p2, in contrast to [Og] 5g4 8s2 derived from Aufbau.  This predicted overlap of orbitals and uncertainty in order of filling, especially for f and g orbitals, renders predictions of chemical and atomic properties of these elements very difficult.

One predicted oxidation state of unbiquadium is +6, which would exist in the halides UbqX6 (X = a halogen), analogous to the known +6 oxidation state in uranium. Like the other early superactinides, the binding energies of unbiquadium's valence electrons are predicted to be small enough that all six should easily participate in chemical reactions. The predicted electron configuration of the Ubq5+ ion is [Og] 6f1.

Notes

References

Bibliography
 
 
 
 
 

 
124